John Mooney (1862–1950) was a Scottish historian.  He was a founder of the Orkney Antiquarian Society.

Biography
Mooney was born in Orkney.  During his lifetime he was the director of R. Garden Ltd, and was also a Kirkwall Town Councillor.

Bibliography
Eynhallow: The Holy Island of The Orkneys
St Magnus, Earl of Orkney
The Cathedral and Royal Burgh of Kirkwall

References

1862 births
1950 deaths
Writers from Orkney
20th-century Scottish historians